Jason Capizzi (born June 19, 1983) is a former American football offensive tackle for the Las Vegas Locomotives of the United Football League (UFL). He was signed by the Pittsburgh Steelers as an undrafted free agent in 2007. Capizzi later won Super Bowl XLIII with the Steelers over the Arizona Cardinals, his only championship. He played college football at Indiana University of Pennsylvania.

Capizzi has also been a member of the New York Jets, Tampa Bay Buccaneers, Kansas City Chiefs, St. Louis Rams, Cleveland Browns and Carolina Panthers.

Professional career

Second stint with Steelers
During the Steelers' 2008 training camp, Capizzi stress fractured his left foot. He was subsequently placed on season-ending injured reserve. He was waived with an injury settlement on August 4.

St. Louis Rams
Capizzi was signed to the practice squad of the St. Louis Rams on October 28, 2008. He remained there until being re-signed by the Steelers on December 23.

Third stint with Steelers
The Pittsburgh Steelers re-signed Capizzi to their active roster off the Rams' practice squad on December 23, 2008 after offensive tackle Marvel Smith was placed on injured reserve.

References

External links
Pittsburgh Steelers bio
Just Sports Stats

1983 births
Living people
Sportspeople from Pennsylvania
American football offensive tackles
Players of American football from Pennsylvania
IUP Crimson Hawks football players
Pittsburgh Steelers players
New York Jets players
Tampa Bay Buccaneers players
Kansas City Chiefs players
St. Louis Rams players
Las Vegas Locomotives players
Cleveland Browns players
Carolina Panthers players